Leonard Melvin Lunde (November 13, 1936 – November 22, 2010) was a professional ice hockey player who played 321 games in the National Hockey League and 72 games in the World Hockey Association. He played for the Chicago Black Hawks, Minnesota North Stars, Vancouver Canucks, Edmonton Oilers, and Detroit Red Wings.

Playing career
Lunde was born in Campbell River, British Columbia, and played junior hockey with the Edmonton Oil Kings of the WCJHL. A prospect of the Detroit Red Wings, he moved up to the Edmonton Flyer of the Western Hockey League, where he scored 39 goals during the 1957–58 season. The following season, he debuted in the National Hockey League, playing in 68 games for the Red Wings, and scoring 14 goals and 12 assists.

He was a regular in the Red Wings' lineup though the 1960–61 season, when Detroit reached the Stanley Cup finals, but after spending a majority of the 1961–62 season in the minors was traded to Chicago in June 1962. With the Black Hawks, he notched six goals and 22 assists playing on a checking line with Eric Nesterenko and Ron Murphy.

Beginning in 1963–64, Lunde was chiefly a minor leaguer over the next few seasons. He did play a handful of games for the Hawks, Minnesota North Stars and Vancouver Canucks but saw most of his ice time as an offensive sparkplug in the American Hockey League, the Western Hockey League and the Central Hockey League.

His best year was 1964–65 when he scored 50 goals for the AHL's Buffalo Bisons and was voted on to the league's first all-star team.

His last full season was 1973–74 with the Edmonton Oilers of the World Hockey Association, where he scored 26 goals and added 22 assists for 48 points.

He also played in Finland with Ilves in 1971–1972 and was head coach of the Finnish national team in World Championships 1973 in Moscow. Lunde had initially retired in 1972 before playing for Edmonton Oilers. Lunde re-retired in 1974, but made a one-game return in 1979, when he played for Mora IK.

Overall, Lunde scored 39 goals and 83 assists, and recorded 75 penalty minutes in 321 NHL games. He also scored three goals and two assists in 20 playoff games.

Post-playing career
Lunde was hired as a European scout of the Edmonton Oilers on August 10, 1979.

Lunde died on November 22, 2010, of a heart condition in Edmonton, Alberta.

Career statistics

Regular season and playoffs

References

External links 

1936 births
2010 deaths
Buffalo Bisons (AHL) players
Canadian ice hockey left wingers
Chicago Blackhawks players
Detroit Red Wings players
Edmonton Flyers (WHL) players
Edmonton Oil Kings (WCHL) players
Edmonton Oilers (WHA) players
Edmonton Oilers scouts
Finland men's national ice hockey team coaches
Ice hockey people from British Columbia
Ilves players
Minnesota North Stars players
Mora IK players
People from Campbell River, British Columbia
Portland Buckaroos players
Rochester Americans players
St. Louis Braves players
Vancouver Canucks players
Vancouver Canucks (WHL) players